Yosvani Pérez Ruiz (born January 23, 1974, in Rodas, Cienfuegos Province, Cuba) is a left-handed pitcher for Cienfuegos of the Cuban National Series, and the Cuban national baseball team. Pérez was part of the Cuban roster at the 2006 World Baseball Classic.

With an 8-5 record and a 2.30 ERA during the 2005-06 season, Pérez was one of the few bright spots for a Cienfuegos team that went 35-54.

References

External links
 

1974 births
Living people
Cuban baseball players
People from Cienfuegos Province
2006 World Baseball Classic players